Infernal Machine is a 1933 American pre-Code thriller film directed by Marcel Varnel and starring Chester Morris, Genevieve Tobin and Victor Jory. The film was based on a novel by Karl Sloboda. Released by Fox Film Corporation, the title is sometimes written as The Infernal Machine. After finishing the film Varnel moved to Britain where he became an established director of comedy films.

Plot
A bomb planted on board a ship may go off at any moment, leaving the crew and passengers in suspense.

Cast
 Chester Morris as Robert Holden
 Genevieve Tobin as Elinor Green
 Victor Jory as Alfred Doreen
 Elizabeth Patterson as Elinor's Aunt
 Edward Van Sloan as Professor Gustabve Hoffman
 Josephine Whittell as Mme. Albini
 James Bell as Spencer
 Arthur Hohl as Ship's Captain

References

External links

1933 films
1930s thriller films
Fox Film films
Films directed by Marcel Varnel
American black-and-white films
American thriller films
Seafaring films
Films scored by Samuel Kaylin
1930s English-language films
1930s American films